The administration of Visakhapatnam officially started in 1803, with the municipality of Visakhapatnam forming in 1861. Currently it is named the Greater Visakhapatnam Municipal Corporation (GVMC). The mayor is elected by corporators who are representative of their wards.

The Visakhapatnam Metropolitan Region Development Authority is a metropolitan planning development authority founded in 2018 that covers Visakhapatnam's metro area, spreading out across Visakhapatnam district, Anakapalli district and Vizianagaram district.
 
The Visakhapatnam City Police was established in 1983. It is headed by a police commissioner and assisted by a joint police commissioner and includes two zones and 44 police stations. Its police system is one of the oldest in India, celebrating its 160-year anniversary in 2021.
 
Visakhapatnam has two parliament seats in Visakhapatnam and Anakapalli, and also has 8 assembly constituencies: Visakhapatnam East, Visakhapatnam South, Visakhapatnam North, Visakhapatnam West, Gajuwaka, Bheemili, Pendurthi and Anakapalle.

Utility services
Water and sanitation is maintained by the GVMC, with all water bodies under its control, supplying water from Raiwada Reservoir, Tatipudi Reservoir, Meghadri Gedda Reservoir, Kanithi Balancing Reservoir and the Godavari water pipeline. 

Electricity is regulated through Andhra Pradesh Eastern Power Distribution Company Limited to the city. The Andhra Pradesh State Disaster Response and Fire Services Department provides emergency services.

References

External links

Government of Visakhapatnam